Snow Australia is the national governing body for the sports of Alpine skiing, Nordic skiing, Freestyle skiing, Snowboarding, Para-alpine and Para-snowboard in Australia.

The name of the organisation was changed from Ski & Snowboard Australia in 2019, coinciding with the unification of the sport in Australia.

It has the overarching responsibility for the entire national athlete pathway, from entry level through to elite, across all disciplines. To meet this responsibility, Snow Australia engages with many different organisations including ski resorts, Federal & State Governments, State Sporting Organisations, Clubs, sporting institutes and industry peak bodies.

Snow Australia has an interesting history that includes the blocking of athletes from competition, including blocking them from World Cup tours which are imperative for their success and continuation in ski and snowboard events.

References

External links
 

Sports governing bodies in Australia
Skiing in Australia
Snowboarding in Australia
Australia